CBCM  may refer to:

 CBCM-FM, the rebroadcaster of the radio station CBLA-FM in Penetanguishene, Ontario, Canada
 Clear Body, Clear Mind, a book published by the Church of Scientology